Straume is the administrative centre of Bø Municipality in Nordland county, Norway. The village is located on the island of Langøya in the Vesterålen archipelago.

Straume is the junction of county roads 820, 901, and 903. The Straume Nature Reserve lies south of the village.

References

Bø, Nordland
Villages in Nordland
Populated places of Arctic Norway
Vesterålen